Nrpendradevi or Nṛpatendradevī (8th-century), was a queen regnant of Sambhupura Chenla in Cambodia.

She was the daughter of queen Indrani of Sambhupura and king Pushkaraksha (also known as Indraloka). Her father was possibly the son of queen Jayadevi, and became her mother's co-regent by marriage.  She inherited the throne from her mother instead of her brother, prince Sambhuvarman (Rudravarman), who instead married their cousin, princess Narendradevi of Chenla.  

Queen Nrpendradevi married her cousin and nephew, her brother's son prince Rajendravarman of Chenla, and became the mother of queen Jayendrabhā, who succeeded her on the throne.

References

Cambodian Hindus
8th-century Cambodian monarchs
8th-century women rulers
8th-century Cambodian women
Chenla